Markus Kuster (born 22 February 1994) is an Austrian professional footballer who plays as a goalkeeper for Swiss club Winterthur.

Club career
On 19 December 2022, Kuster signed with Winterthur in Switzerland until the end of the 2022–23 season.

International career
Kuster was called up to the Austrian first team on 25 March 2017 for a friendly match against Finland, replacing the injured Andreas Lukse.

References

External links

Living people
1994 births
Association football goalkeepers
Austrian footballers
Austria under-21 international footballers
Footballers from Vienna
Austrian Football Bundesliga players
2. Liga (Austria) players
2. Bundesliga players
SV Mattersburg players
Karlsruher SC players
FC Winterthur players
Austrian expatriate footballers
Austrian expatriate sportspeople in Germany
Expatriate footballers in Germany
Austrian expatriate sportspeople in Switzerland
Expatriate footballers in Switzerland